The End Begins is a 1961 Australian television play shot in ABC's Melbourne studios. Like many early Australian TV plays it was based on an overseas script. It was a rare Australian TV play with a science fiction theme and a black lead actor, although no recordings are thought to have survived.

Plot
On an island off the west coast of Great Britain, a group of survivors of World War Three struggle to continue living. Hugh Packenham foresaw the oncoming conflict and fled to the island. His only neighbours are fisherman Shaun O'Donnell and his wife Barbara. Then other survivors seek refuge, including an African American sailor, and conflicts develop.

Cast
Don Crosby as Hugh Pakenham
Joe Jenkins as Hank Christians, an American serviceman
Douglas Kelly as Shaun O'Donnell
Barbara Brandon as Mrs O'Donnell
Fay Kelton as Valerie Hollis, a young English girl
Keith Hudson as Tom Jarrow, a bank clerk
Syd Conabere as Dr Wincot
Kenrick Hudson as Commander Ridgwell
James Lynch as Petty Officer Marks
David Mitchell as Seaman Wells
Edward Brayshaw as Smithers
Elizabeth Goodman as woman

Productions
It was based on a British TV play by Ray Rigby, who wrote it in collaboration with his wife Jean when working as a booking clerk at Victoria station. He submitted it to the BBC and they filmed it in 1956 in a production starring Earl Cameron. Rigby later became well known for writing The Hill. His play was later adapted for Australian radio in 1964.

The production was filmed in Melbourne. It was William Sterling's first production after returning to Australia following a trip overseas. Sterling said prior to broadcast:
This is perhaps the most controversial play the ABC has attempted on television. There are a number of dramatic developments that which are not comfortable, easy-way-out solutions of many of the moral and political problems of everyday life. The author's treatment is adult in every sense. This is the type of play television handles best. In fact, this is the first play in a long time that has made such a dramatic comment on contemporary affairs.
The set was created by Douglas Smith who did the designs for Stormy Petrel.

The cast included Joe Jenkins, a black American actor and dancer who came to Australia with the Katherine Dunham Dance Company and decided to stay. He was one of the few black actors to play a lead role in Australia at that time.

Reception
The Sydney Morning Herald said it "had the merit of exploratory camera work" and called it "quite imaginative".

References

External links

The End Begins at National Film and Sound Archive

1960s Australian television plays
Australian television films
1961 television plays
Australian science fiction films
Films directed by William Sterling (director)